Crusea (common name saucer flower) is a genus of angiosperms (flowering plants) in the family Rubiaceae. The genus is found in the south-western United States (Arizona and New Mexico), Mexico, and Central America. A few species are naturalized in Cuba and Puerto Rico.

Species
Crusea andersoniorum Lorence – Oaxaca
Crusea calcicola Greenm – San Luis Potosí, Querétaro, Guerrero, Oaxaca, Honduras
Crusea calocephala DC. – widespread from Tamaulipas to Honduras
Crusea coccinea DC.
Crusea coccinea var. breviloba Loes. – from Sinaloa to Guatemala and Belize
Crusea coccinea var. chiriquensis W.R.Anderson – Costa Rica and Panama
Crusea coccinea var. coccinea – from Jalisco to Oaxaca
Crusea coronata B.L.Rob. & Greenm. – from Sonora to Oaxaca
Crusea diversifolia (Kunth) W.R.Anderson – widespread from Arizona and New Mexico to Guatemala
Crusea hispida (Mill.) Rob. 
Crusea hispida var. grandiflora (Paul G.Wilson) W.R.Anderson – Guerrero, México State, Distrito Federal
Crusea hispida var. hispida – widespread across much of Mexico and naturalized in Cuba
Crusea longiflora (Roem. & Schult.) W.R.Anderson – widespread across much of Mexico and naturalized in Puerto Rico
Crusea lucida Benth. – Sonora, Sinaloa, Jalisco, Nayarit, Colima, Michoacán, Guerrero
Crusea megalocarpa (A.Gray) S.Watson – widespread across much of Mexico
Crusea parviflora Hook. & Arn. – widespread across much of Mexico, south to Nicaragua
Crusea psyllioides (Kunth) W.R.Anderson – widespread across much of Mexico
Crusea pulcherrima Borhidi & Salas-Mor. – Oaxaca
Crusea setosa (M.Martens & Galeotti) Standl. & Steyerm. – widespread across much of Mexico, south to Nicaragua
Crusea wrightii A.Gray
Crusea wrightii var. angustifolia W.R.Anderson – central and southern Mexico
Crusea wrightii var. wrightii – widespread across much of Mexico, north into Arizona

References

External links
Crusea in the World Checklist of Rubiaceae
Vascular Plants of the Gila Wilderness, Western New Mexico University
Irekani, Universidad Nacional Autónoma de México
Gardening Europe
Photo of herbarium specimen at Missouri Botanical Garden, isotype of  Crusea wrightii var. angustifolia, collected in Guerrero

Rubiaceae genera
Spermacoceae
Flora of Central America